Timothy Elmes (born 28 September 1962) is an English former professional footballer who played in the Football League as a midfielder.

Elmes signed as an apprentice with Chelsea in July 1979. He left Chelsea in 1982, spent a short time with Orient, and went on to play for Croydon and then Redhill.

References

Sources
Tim Elmes, Neil Brown

1962 births
Living people
English footballers
Association football midfielders
Chelsea F.C. players
English Football League players
Redhill F.C. players
Croydon F.C. players
Leyton Orient F.C. players